Appukutti Arachchige Dona Indralatha (born August 27, 1973, in Colombo, Sri Lanka) is a Sri Lanka cricketer. She was a right-handed batsman as well as right-arm medium-fast bowler.

References

1973 births
Living people
Sri Lankan women cricketers
Sri Lanka women One Day International cricketers
Cricketers from Colombo